John Talbot (21 September 1797 – 22 September 1874) was a schoolmaster, journalist, and merchant.

Born in Cloughjordan, County Tipperary, Ireland, he arrived in Upper Canada in 1818. He was part of a group brought out by his father, Richard Talbot. in order to obtain a large land grant. This did not occur and John, after a number of years of wandering, became a schoolmaster in London Township in 1830.

It is believed that Talbot became a Reformer because of the failed land grant which he considered to be his right.

External links 
Biography at the Dictionary of Canadian Biography Online

Canadian newspaper journalists
People from Cloughjordan
1797 births
1874 deaths